Akaba Martin Longkümer (born 7 July 1992), known professionally as Macnivil, is an Indian rapper, songwriter and music video director from Nagaland. He is considered as one of the pioneers of the Nagamese Hip hop scene in Nagaland. He further gained success after the release of his album Ura Uvie.

Early life and career
Macnivil was born on 7 July 1992 in Kohima, Nagaland to a Naga family. He has Ao Naga ancestry on his father's side and Konyak Naga ancestry on his mother's side. He did his schooling from Ministers' Hill Baptist Higher Secondary School in Kohima, Nagaland.

In 2019, Macnivil gained success for releasing Ura Uvie, the first ever rap album in the Nagamese language.

Discography

Studio albums
Ura Uvie (2019)

Other songs
"The Warm Up (Freestyle)" (2019)
"Tomorrow's Not The Same" (2021)

Filmography

Music video directions

Awards and nominations

References

External links

 
 
 Macnivil on Spotify

1992 births
Living people
Indian male singer-songwriters
Indian singer-songwriters
Indian rappers
Naga people
People from Kohima
Ministers' Baptist Higher Secondary School alumni